Sita (minor planet designation: 244 Sita) is a background asteroid from the inner region of the asteroid belt, approximately  in diameter. It was discovered on 14 October 1884, by an Austrian astronomer Johann Palisa in the Vienna Observatory. It was named for the Hindu deity Sita.

References

External links 
 The Asteroid Orbital Elements Database
 Minor Planet Discovery Circumstances
 
 

Background asteroids
Sita
Sita
Slow rotating minor planets
Sa-type asteroids (SMASS)
18841014